The  is a Japanese bolt-action rifle, based on the Type 38 rifle. Following the standard practice of the time, it was adapted from an existing infantry rifle. The only difference between this rifle and the original Type 38 is that it had a lightened stock, a 2.5 power telescopic sight and a mid-band setup for a monopod, although later models had this deleted. The rifle entered service in 1937. When fired, the mild 6.5x50mm Arisaka cartridge gave off little flash or smoke and made counter-sniper activity difficult. The scope was offset to the left, to allow stripper clip loading. Like other Mauser pattern rifles, it has a five-round box magazine. The rifle can be loaded with either a 5-round stripper clip, or single rounds.

The Type 97 was manufactured at the Nagoya Arsenal and Kokura Arsenal, with the bulk of them made in Nagoya.

Combat history 
After fighting German-trained Chinese snipers, the Japanese Army decided to develop snipers for themselves. Training in camouflage, field craft and other such techniques was common to normal Japanese infantry, so snipers were specially trained only in shooting and given a sniper rifle.

Type 97 was the standard Japanese sniper rifle, a regular Type 38 Arisaka fitted with a scope. The Type 97 was used frequently by Japanese snipers, often hidden in palm trees or more usually hidden positions, with deadly results. As they were chambered for the 6.5x50SR Japanese cartridge, which produced virtually no smoke or flash from the long barrel of the Type or Type 97, it was a difficult rifle to spot at ranges greater than 150 yards. Experienced US troops knew they had to continue their advance when fired on by Japanese snipers in order to get closer and spot the sniper.

After World War II, Type 97 captured from the IJA were converted to use the 7.62×39mm cartridge since the PLA was being equipped with AK and SKS rifles in that caliber.

Two versions of the converted Type 97 consisted of rifles with just a SKS barrel or of a SKS barrel with a front stock cap and folding bayonet.

References

Bolt-action rifles of Japan
World War II infantry weapons of Japan
Sniper rifles of Japan
Military equipment introduced in the 1930s